Mount Kazukaitis is a peak of the Walker Mountains, located at the base of Hughes Peninsula in the western part of Thurston Island, Antarctica. It was delineated from air photos taken by U.S. Navy Operation Highjump in December 1946. It was named by the Advisory Committee on Antarctic Names for Chief Photographer's Mate Frank Kazukaitis of the U.S. Navy who recorded features of the Walgreen Coast and Eights Coast on the U.S. Navy Bellingshausen Sea Expedition in February 1960. He served as photographer on several additional Operation Deep Freeze deployments to Antarctica.

See also
 Mountains in Antarctica

Maps
 Thurston Island – Jones Mountains. 1:500000 Antarctica Sketch Map. US Geological Survey, 1967.
 Antarctic Digital Database (ADD). Scale 1:250000 topographic map of Antarctica. Scientific Committee on Antarctic Research (SCAR). Since 1993, regularly upgraded and updated.

References

Mountains of Ellsworth Land